Logistics House is a skyscraper in Braamfontein, Johannesburg, South Africa. It has 25 floors. The building is the former headquarters of South African Airways.

See also 
 List of tallest buildings in South Africa

References 

Buildings and structures completed in 1974
Skyscraper office buildings in Johannesburg
20th-century architecture in South Africa